Hidde Sjoerds de Vries (22 December 1645, Sexbierum - 1 July 1694, North Sea), was a Dutch commander, like his uncle Tjerk Hiddes de Vries. During the Battle of Texel 1694, his ship was captured by the French and he died of wounds.

Notes

References
Haws, Duncan; Hurst, Alexander Anthony (1985). The Maritime History of the World: A Chronological Survey of Maritime Events from 5,000 B.C. Until the Present Day, Supplemented by Commentaries. Brighton, Sussex: Teredo Books. .

1622 births
1666 deaths
17th-century Dutch military personnel
Admirals of the navy of the Dutch Republic
People from Franekeradeel
Dutch military personnel of the Nine Years' War